Parmanpur is a place in Mirzapur district, near Kollapur, in Uttar Pradesh state in northern India.

Villages in Mirzapur district